Thaddeus Stanley "Ted" Lepcio (July 28, 1929 – December 11, 2019) was an American professional baseball utility infielder, who played in Major League Baseball (MLB) for the Boston Red Sox, Detroit Tigers, Philadelphia Phillies, Chicago White Sox, and Minnesota Twins.

Lepcio attended Seton Hall University. A one-time semi-professional baseball player in Oneida, New York, he was signed by the Boston Red Sox, as an amateur free agent, in 1951. Lepcio played his first MLB game, in 1952, and would play most of his professional career with the Red Sox. He was generally a utility infielder who could play second base, third base, or shortstop. Lepcio's best year was 1956, when he hit 15 home runs, nine of which came in an eighteen-day stretch. He is mentioned in Jimmy Piersall's book, Fear Strikes Out, as his roommate during the 1952 season, when Piersall had to be hospitalized with mental issues. Lepcio often saved Piersall from being beaten up by his own teammates.

On July 13, 1961, Lepcio hit a grand slam in the first inning against the Cleveland Indians, which would turn out to be the deciding factor in the Twins' 9 to 6 victory. After Lepcio retired, following the 1961 season, he became a vice president of sales with St Johnsbury Trucking Co Inc, a New England trucking company. He also remained active in baseball and often chaired Red Sox events. He died on December 11, 2019 in Dedham, Massachusetts.

References

External links

Ted Lepcio at SABR (Baseball BioProject)

1929 births
2019 deaths
Major League Baseball infielders
Baseball players from New York (state)
Boston Red Sox players
Detroit Tigers players
Philadelphia Phillies players
Chicago White Sox players
Minnesota Twins players
Seton Hall Pirates baseball players
Roanoke Ro-Sox players
Louisville Colonels (minor league) players
Syracuse Chiefs players
Sportspeople from Utica, New York
People from Oneida, New York
American people of Polish descent
Sportspeople from Dedham, Massachusetts